Priarius ( - 378) was a king of the Lentienses, a sub-tribe of the Alemanni, in the 4th century. He is mentioned by Ammianus Marcellinus. In 378, Priarius fought the Western Roman Empire at Battle of Argentovaria, near Neuf-Brisach, France, in which he was defeated and killed.

References

Further reading 
 Dieter Geuenich: Geschichte der Alemannen.  Kohlhammer Verlag, Stuttgart 2005, 2. revised edition., pp. 31, 63, 162, 171 (German)
 Dieter Geuenich: Lentienses. In: Reallexikon der Germanischen Altertumskunde (RGA). 2. edition, volume 18, Walter de Gruyter, Berlin / New York 2001, pp. 266–267 (German)
 Moritz Schönfeld: Lentienses. In: Paulys Realencyclopädie der classischen Altertumswissenschaft (RE). Band XII,2, Stuttgart 1925, Sp. 1944 (German)

378 deaths
4th-century Germanic people
Alemannic rulers
Alemannic warriors
Monarchs killed in action